Chak Shahzad, is a modern suburb situated in the Islamabad Capital Territory of Pakistan. 

Historically, the suburb was home to Malik and Chowdhury tribesmen, but recently has seen a growth in farmhouses of the rich and wealthy from nearby Islamabad, including that of Pervez Musharraf, Makhdoom Ameen Faheem and Dr Tariq Fazal Chaudhry. The ex-cricketer and political leader Imran Khan also lives nearby in Bani Gala. The journalist Javed Chaudhry lives in Shahzad town which is adjacent to Chak Shahzad.

Location 
It is neighboring to Bani Gala, Kuri, and Taramri.
The private housing society of Malik Riaz, Bahria Enclave Islamabad, is  4 km away from Chak Shahzad. Zero Point Interchange, the centre of the city, is 12 km away.

Services and facilities

Educational

Schools and colleges 
Islamabad Model College For Boys (F.A) Chak Shahzad
PakTurk Maarif International School
Allied School Capital Campus Islamabad
Roots Millennium Schools Oxbridge Campus

Specialization institutions 
Health Services Academy (HSA)
Institute of Health & Management Sciences

Universities 
COMSATS University Islamabad Campus
Iqra University Chak Shahzad Campus
King Hamad University of Nursing and Associated Medical Sciences
Abasyn University Islamabad Campus

Health 
National Institute of Health (NIH)
Federal General Hospital Chak Shahzad 
Regional Blood Center Islamabad
Medikay Cardiac Centre

Research 

National Agricultural Research Centre (NARC)
Geoscience Advance Research Laboratories (GARL)

See also
Capital Development Authority
Developments in Islamabad
Shahzad Town
Bani Gala
Kuri, ICT
Alipur Farash

References 

Union councils of Islamabad Capital Territory
Villages in Islamabad Capital Territory